David Epel is a researcher at Hopkins Marine Station in Pacific Grove, California, and a Professor (Emeritus) in the Department of Biology at Stanford University.

Epel earned his Ph.D. at University of California Berkeley under Daniel Mazia. He arrived at Hopkins Marine Station in 1965. Subsequently, Professor Epel spent seven years at University of California San Diego's Scripps Institution of Oceanography.  He completed a postdoc with Britton Chance at the University of Pennsylvania.
Professor Epel has been a Guggenheim Fellow, and is a Fellow of the American Association for the Advancement of Science.

Research Focus
His work focuses on egg activation during fertilization, as well as stress on embryonic development.

Scientific Lineage

External links
Epel's Lab

University of California, Berkeley alumni
Stanford University Department of Biology faculty
Fellows of the American Academy of Arts and Sciences
Living people
Fellows of Clare Hall, Cambridge
People from Pacific Grove, California
Year of birth missing (living people)